Jeffrey Scott Tanaka (1958  November 3, 1992) was an American psychologist and statistician, known for his work in educational psychology, social psychology and various fields of statistics including structural equation modeling.

Biography
Tanaka was born in Los Angeles in 1958 to parents Margaret and Shoji Tanaka. In 1979, Tanaka received an A.B. (cum laude) in quantitative psychology at UCLA, followed by an M.A. in psychology in 1980 and a PhD in psychometrics in 1984.

His professional academic career began at New York University (NYU), where he was assistant professor of psychology from 1983. In 1990, he joined the University of Illinois, Urbana-Champaign as associate professor while continuing his career at NYU as visiting research associate professor.

Tanaka applied himself in a wide range of fields. As a psychologist, he worked in social psychology, educational psychology and cognition. In statistics, his research interests included structural equation modeling, factor analysis and categorical data analysis.

On November 3, 1992, Tanaka died in an automobile accident near Bondville, Illinois at the age of 34.

Legacy
Due to his work with the American Psychological Association (APA) in raising awareness for ethnic minority issues in academia (Tanaka was an ethnic minority himself), the APA named their Jeffrey S. Tanaka Dissertation Award in his memory.

In 1993, the Journal of Personality started to run a series of papers titled The Jeffrey S. Tanaka Occasional Papers in Quantitative Methods for Personality in Tanaka's memory. As of 2011, papers were still being written for the series.

In 1994, the Society of Multivariate Experimental Psychology introduced the Tanaka Award for Best Article in Multivariate Behavioral Research, given annually to the authors of the most outstanding paper in the Multivariate Behavioral Research journal.

Publications

Selected academic works
The works below are listed by number of times cited (descending), according to data from Google Scholar (correct as of January 2017).

References

1958 births
1992 deaths
20th-century American psychologists
New York University faculty
University of California, Los Angeles alumni
University of Illinois Urbana-Champaign faculty